San Buenaventura is the second-largest community in the municipality of Ixtapaluca in the eastern part of Mexico State, Mexico. In the 2005 INEGI Census, the town reported a population of 48,037 inhabitants.

References
Link to tables of population data from Census of 2005 INEGI: Instituto Nacional de Estadística, Geografía e Informática

External links
Portal Oficial de Ixtapaluca Official website of Municipality of Ixtapaluca

Populated places in the State of Mexico
Ixtapaluca